The Emperor's Tomb is a 1938 novel by the Austrian writer Joseph Roth. The Overlook Press published an English translation by John Hoare in 1984. The novel was adapted into the 1971 film Trotta directed by Johannes Schaaf. New Directions Publishing Corporation published a new translation by Michael Hofmann in 2013.

New German edition, based on the first print: Joseph Roth, Die Kapuzinergruft, ed. by Werner Bellmann, Reclam, Stuttgart 2013. [with detailed commentary and epilog]

See also
 1938 in literature
 Austrian literature

References

External links
 The Emperor's Tomb at Projekt Gutenberg-DE 

1938 German-language novels
Austrian novels
Swedish novels adapted into films
Novels by Joseph Roth
Novels set in Austria-Hungary
Works about Austria-Hungary
The Overlook Press books